Thyrassia is a genus of moths of the family Zygaenidae described by Arthur Gardiner Butler in 1876.

Selected species
Thyrassia aprepes Swinhoe, 1905
Thyrassia aurodisca Hampson, 1891
Thyrassia diversa Walker, 1864
Thyrassia inconcinna Swinhoe, 1892
Thyrassia penangae (Moore, 1859)
Thyrassia philippina Jordan, 1908
Thyrassia procumbens Snellen, 1895
Thyrassia scutellaris Jordan, 1925
Thyrassia subcordata Walker, 1854
Thyrassia virescens Hampson, 1892

References

Procridinae
Zygaenidae genera